Frankfurt Grand Prix may refer to:

Rund um den Henninger Turm, the cycling race
Frankfurt Grand Prix (tennis), a former ATP top-tier tennis tournament